Elvis Rexhbeçaj (born 1 November 1997) is a Kosovan professional footballer who plays as a midfielder for  club FC Augsburg.

Career

VfL Wolfsburg
On 20 August 2017, Rexhbeçaj signed a professional contract with Bundesliga side VfL Wolfsburg. On 28 January 2018, he made his debut in a 1–0 away win against Hannover 96 after coming on as a substitute at 84th minute in place of Daniel Didavi.

Loan at 1. FC Köln
In January 2020, it was announced that Rexhbeçaj would be loaned to 1. FC Köln until June 2021. The move included an option to remain permanently at the club.

Loan at VfL Bochum
On 2 August 2021 Rexhbeçaj was loaned to VfL Bochum for the 2021–22 season.

Augsburg
On 27 July 2022, Rexhbeçaj signed a four-year contract with Augsburg.

Personal life
Rexhbeçaj was born in the village of Gjonaj and is of Kosovo Albanian descent. His family fled from Kosovo during the Kosovo War and settled in Brandenburg.

References

External links
 
 

1997 births
Living people
People from Prizren
German people of Kosovan descent
German people of Albanian descent
Yugoslav Wars refugees
Kosovan refugees
Naturalized citizens of Germany
Kosovan emigrants to Germany
Albanian emigrants to Germany
German footballers
Kosovan footballers
Association football midfielders
Bundesliga players
Regionalliga players
VfL Wolfsburg II players
VfL Wolfsburg players
1. FC Köln players
VfL Bochum players
FC Augsburg players